Asemonea amatola is a jumping spider species in the genus Asemonea that lives in South Africa. The female was first identified in 2013.

References

Endemic fauna of South Africa
Salticidae
Spiders described in 2013
Spiders of South Africa
Taxa named by Wanda Wesołowska